Sheng may refer to:

 Sheng (instrument) (笙), a Chinese wind instrument
 Sheng (surname) (盛), a Chinese surname
 Sheng (Chinese opera), a major role in Chinese opera
 Sheng (升), ancient Chinese unit of volume, approximately 1 liter
 Sheng pu'er, a type of pu-erh tea
 Provinces of China (省), administrative divisions called shěng in Mandarin
 Sheng slang, a slang dialect of the Swahili language

See also
Cheng (disambiguation)
Zheng (disambiguation)
Shen (disambiguation)